The Pride House in Beersheba is a local LGBT organization in Beersheba, Israel, that works for the LGBT community in Beersheba and the Negev, promotes LGBT rights in Israel, Beersheba and the Negev in particular, and has various social activities for the local LGBT community. The organization has been active since 2000, as a local branch of the Israeli LGBT association, and in 2015 separated from the organization and established itself as a separate local organization.

History 

The Pride House of Be'er Sheva was established as a local branch of the LGBT association in the end of 1999

In 2016, the new organization "Pride House" submitted a request to hold a pride event as every year. At first, the police gave permission to hold a parade. Later on, various objections were raised by Rabbi Yehuda Deri, and religious representatives of the municipal council.In light of the change in the municipality and the police's position, the Pride House in Be'er Sheva, in cooperation with the Association for Civil Rights in Israel, appealed to the High Court of Justice of Israel, in Jerusalem.

In light of the claim, the High Court's decision was not to accept the request to march. The Pride House representatives refused to accept a march of only 50 meters in an ally.

A year after the largest gay demonstration in the history of the city of Be'er Sheva, on June 22nd 2017 the Pride House organized the first LGBT Pride Parade in Be’er Sheva with the participation of some 4,000 marchers. At the end of the parade there was a pride event organized by the Be'er Sheva Municipality, in which the mayor delivered a speech.  In his speech, the mayor asked the city's residents to show tolerance and acceptance of each other, in Be'er Sheva, which is a city of communities.
After the Parades in 2018 and 2019 and the interruption in 2020 because of corona, in June 2021 and 2022 the 4th and 5th Pride Parade was again organized by Pride House and supported by the municipality.

2017 a decision was made by the local council to establish an urban LGBT community framework for the LGBT community in the city, as part of the communities' fabric, and to support the LGBT community. The municipality started to finance the community and even helps finance a designated social worker. In March 2017, Beersheba city council announced it will provide a municipal building for the Pride House. Already on November 30th the official launch of the new building was celebrated.The Pride House is hosting a variety of events, e.g. an LGBT English Speaker Group, an evening with trans-biographies, meeting with youth groups to reduce prejudices, LGBT-Bet-Midrash-Group to read the Tanach under a queer viewpoint.

References

External links
 Facebook-Site (Hebrew)

Organizations based in Beersheba
LGBT organizations in Israel
Non-profit organizations based in Israel
1999 establishments in Israel
Buildings and structures in Beersheba